Naval Air Station (NAS) Melbourne was a United States Naval Base in Melbourne, Florida. The Navy used NAS Melbourne for gunnery training for pilots of carrier-based fighter aircraft and as a base for WAVES during World War II.  While operational, over 2,200 U.S. Navy and U.S. Marine Corps Naval Aviators trained in Grumman F4F Wildcats and F6F Hellcats at NAS Melbourne.

History
The Navy constructed NAS Melbourne at the Melbourne Municipal Airport at the beginning of World War II and commissioned it on October 20, 1942 as Operational Training Unit No. 2. The Navy closed the site on February 12, 1946 and returned it to the City of Melbourne as surplus property in 1947. Currently, the City of Melbourne Airport Authority operates the site as the Melbourne Orlando International Airport.

As an active military base, Naval Air Station Melbourne contained 129 buildings and served more than 310 officers and 1,355 enlisted personnel of the U.S. Navy and U.S. Marine Corps. During the station's operation, 63 personnel died in aerial accidents and two enlisted men died in ground-related accidents.  

The station published two newspapers, starting with the Melbourne Wildcat from 1943–44, which was replaced by the Melbourne Hellcat from 1944-46

As of 2019, the worst aircraft accident occurred in South Brevard County, on March 26, 1944. A B-24E bomber from Chatham Field, Savannah, Georgia, suffering from multiple engine failures, crashed near Eau Gallie while attempting an emergency nighttime landing at the Naval Air Station. Ten airmen were killed. The co-pilot, Lt. Basil R. Huntress, was the only survivor.

See also
Airport Museum at Melbourne International Airport
Accidents and incidents involving the Consolidated B-24 Liberator, March 26, 1944

Notes

External links

Melbourne International Airport Official Website. The About MLB section contains a webpage with a history of Melbourne International Airport.
NAS Melbourne, Florida. This website provides excellent images of NAS Melbourne.

1942 establishments in Florida
1946 disestablishments in Florida
Melbourne
Buildings and structures in Melbourne, Florida
Military installations in Florida
Military in Brevard County, Florida
Military airbases established in 1942
Military installations closed in 1946
Closed installations of the United States Navy